The Australia World Cup was a women's professional road bicycle racing event held annually in Australia from 1998 to 2008 as part of the UCI Women's Road World Cup. The location of the race varied: in 1998, it was held in Sydney; from 1999 to 2001, it was held in Canberra; in 2002 it was held in the Snowy Mountains and; from 2003 to 2008 it was held in Geelong, Victoria.

Past winners

See also
Cadel Evans Great Ocean Road Race
Race Torquay

References
Official site

UCI Women's Road World Cup
Cycle races in Australia
Women's road bicycle races
Recurring sporting events established in 1998
Sport in Geelong
Defunct cycling races in Australia
Recurring sporting events disestablished in 2008
1998 establishments in Australia
2008 disestablishments in Australia